The Jakhro (Sindhi جکرو) is Sindhi tribe of Sindh, Pakistan. Jakhro is a subdivision of Abro tribe which is driven from Sammat tribe, not to be confused with other tribe (Sindhi جاکرا  which has same spelling in English.

History
The Jakhro tribe has been praised by the famous Sindhi poet Shah Abdul Latif Bhittai. The compilation of the verses could be found in Shah Jo Risalo the sur (chapter) is Bilawal. The English translation of this chapter has been done by Elsa Kazi  . A sample of the translation is given below,

Jakhro worthy is, and the rest but name of 'king' do bear;               جَکِرو جَسَ کَرو، ٻِيا سَڀِ اَنِيرا؛ 
As Jakhro was produced, others that way no fashioned were;              جِيائِين جُڙيو جَکِرو، تِيائِين نه ٻِيا؛ 
Clay needed for his make so rare for him was just enough. . مِٽِي تَنهِن ماڳا، اَصُلُ هُئِي ايتِرِي

External links
  http://www.bhurgri.com/bhurgri/sd_shah_bilawal.php
  http://www.sindhiadabiboard.org/catalogue/Lateefyat/Book1/Book_page11.html

References

Social groups of Pakistan
Sindhi tribes